Věra Machoninová (born 27 September 1928) is a Czech Brutalist architect who completed a number of projects with her husband .

Education 
Věra Větrovská was born in 1928 in Strakonice, First Czechoslovak Republic. Větrovská attended the Czech Technical University in Prague's Faculty of Architecture. At the university she met Vladimír Machonin, whom she married in 1948. In 1952, Machoninová completed her studies and graduated.

Gallery

References 

Czech women architects
20th-century Czech architects
1928 births
Living people
Brutalist architects
Czech Technical University in Prague alumni
People from Strakonice